Doug McAvoy (2 January 1939 – 12 May 2019) was a British trade union leader. He was General Secretary of the National Union of Teachers from 1989 to 2004.

A teacher, McAvoy was secretary of Newcastle-upon-Tyne NUT and became a member of the National Executive of the Union in 1970. He was appointed Deputy General-Secretary designate in 1974, a post he held until 1989, when he became the first directly elected General Secretary.

References

External links
Interview: Teachers' leader Doug McAvoy, BBC News, 22 April 2000
'McAvoy warns over union militants', BBC News, 23 June 1999
'Furious McAvoy walks out of NUT meeting', The Independent, 29 May 2004

1939 births
2019 deaths
General Secretaries of the National Union of Teachers
Schoolteachers from Northumberland
English trade unionists
Members of the General Council of the Trades Union Congress